The Church of San Bartolomé (Spanish: Iglesia de San Bartolomé) is a Roman Catholic church located in Campisábalos, Spain. It was declared Bien de Interés Cultural in 1965.

The church was erected in Romanesque-style during the 12th and 13th-centuries.

References 

Bien de Interés Cultural landmarks in the Province of Guadalajara
Churches in the Province of Guadalajara
12th-century Roman Catholic church buildings in Spain
Romanesque architecture in Castilla–La Mancha